The Kızılada Lighthouse is an historical lighthouse still in use, which is located on  the island Kızılada in the Gulf of Fethiye, southwestern Turkey.

History
The masonry lighthouse was constructed in 1910 by Frenchmen on the southern point of the island. The -tall lighthouse tower with a gallery around the lantern room has the form of a cylinder and is white painted. A one-story keeper's house is attached to it. It is also equıipped with racon device. Operated and maintained by the Coastal Safety Authority of the Ministry of Transport and Communication, it is listed in Turkey under the code "TUR-037" and registered internationally under E5841. The lighthouse was renovated in 2007, and is powered by a wind turbine. It is floodlit at night.

In 2007, the lighthouse was opened to tourism pursuant to a 49-year lease to the Kizilada Tourism Corporation. A seafood restaurant was opened next to the lighthouse in 2007, and the next year a hostel with nine rooms was added.

In 2008, a 31.47-grams silver coin was minted with the lighthouse's profile.

Aviation accident
The cause of the accident was a propeller failure. The lighthouse keeper Mustafa Pehlivan rushed to the accident site by boat and rescued some survivors. He also alerted customs officials and fishermen who helped in the rescue. Of the 8 aircrew and 34 passengers on board, 38 survived the accident while four passengers drowned. The location of the aircraft's wreck underwater is still unknown.

See also

 List of lighthouses in Turkey

References

Notes

Citations

External links
 Directorate General of Coastal Safety 
Madeni Para Kataloğu : Madeni paralar ‹ 40 New Lira (Lighthouses - Kızılada Feneri)
Satellite picture of the light

Lighthouses in Turkey
Lighthouses completed in 1910
Tourist attractions in Muğla Province
Mediterranean Sea
Buildings and structures in Muğla Province
Fethiye